Vimana may mean:

Vimana, the "flying chariot" of the Sanskrit epics.
In most modern Indian languages, the word vimāna, vimān  means aircraft.
"Biman" is the same word in the Bengali language and is Bengali for "airplane", and is the national airline of Bangladesh.
The Buddhist book Vimānavatthu (Pali for "Vimāna Stories") uses the word "vimāna" to mean "a small piece of text used as the inspiration for a Buddhist sermon".
The adytum of a Rama Temple.
Vimanapura is a suburb of Bangalore in India. The very busy Airport Road, Bangalore goes through it.
Vimanam, the distinctive pyramidical roof-towers of south Indian temples and is the sanctum of a Hindu temple where the deity is enshrined.
The ICP Vimana ultralight aircraft.
Vimana, a 1991 video game. 
Vimana, a 1976 album by the Italian progressive rock and jazz fusion group, Nova.